Rex Kalamian is an American professional basketball coach who serves as assistant coach for the Detroit Pistons of the National Basketball Association (NBA) and the head coach for the Armenia men's national basketball team. He previously had coaching terms with the Los Angeles Clippers, Denver Nuggets, Minnesota Timberwolves, Sacramento Kings, Oklahoma City Thunder, and Toronto Raptors. He is well known for his nine years with the Clippers.

Coaching career

Oklahoma City Thunder (2009–2015)
Kalamian spent six seasons with the Thunder, including the final two as lead assistant for Scott Brooks. The Thunder posted a 316-160 (.664) mark during the regular season and was 39-34 (.534) in the postseason during Kalamian's tenure. Oklahoma City won eight-of-13 playoff series.

Kalamian helped the Thunder reach the Western Conference Finals three times and NBA Finals once. Kalamian participated in two All-Star Games (2012, 2014) as an assistant coach and served as a head coach for the 2014 BBVA Compass Rising Stars Challenge during All-Star Weekend in New Orleans.

Toronto Raptors (2015–2018)
On June 29, 2015, he was hired to serve as an assistant coach by the Toronto Raptors.

Los Angeles Clippers (2018–2020)
On June 15, 2018, he was hired to serve as an assistant coach by the Los Angeles Clippers.

Sacramento Kings (2020–2021)
On November 5, 2020, Kalamian was hired as an assistant coach by the Sacramento Kings.

Detroit Pistons (2021–present)
On June 16, 2021, Kalamian was hired as an assistant coach by the Detroit Pistons

Armenian National Team (2022-present)
On January 20, 2022, Kalamian agreed to become the new head coach of the Armenian national team.

Personal life
Prior to the NBA, Kalamian worked for two seasons as an assistant at his former school, East Los Angeles College. As a player, he was named team captain at East Los Angeles where he led the South Coast Conference in three-point shooting percentage during the 1988-89 season.

An Armenian-American, Kalamian attended East Los Angeles College, but graduated from Cal Poly Pomona with a bachelor's degree in business management.

Rex Kalamian owns a home in Scottsdale, AZ.

References

Year of birth missing (living people)
Living people
American people of Armenian descent
Cal Poly Pomona Broncos men's basketball players
Denver Nuggets assistant coaches
East Los Angeles College alumni
Los Angeles Clippers assistant coaches
Los Angeles Clippers scouts
Minnesota Timberwolves assistant coaches
Oklahoma City Thunder assistant coaches
Sacramento Kings assistant coaches
Toronto Raptors assistant coaches